
Hajnówka County is a unit of territorial administration and local government (powiat) in Podlaskie Voivodeship, north-eastern Poland, on the border with Belarus. It came into being on January 1, 1999, as a result of the Polish local government reforms passed in 1998.

As of 2019 its total population is 42,851, out of which the population of Hajnówka is 20,580, that of Kleszczele is 1,250, and the rural population is 21,021.

Neighbouring counties
Hajnówka County is bordered by Siemiatycze County to the south-west, Bielsk County to the west and Białystok County to the north. It also borders Belarus to the east.

Administrative division
The county is subdivided into nine gminas (one urban, one urban-rural and seven rural). These are listed in the following table, in descending order of population.

References

 
Land counties of Podlaskie Voivodeship